Marianna Zorba (born 1 December 1967 in Athens) is a Greek singer and a music teacher. She loves ethnic and folk music. In 1997 she represented Greece in the 42nd Eurovision Song Contest. She was engaged to Manolis Manouselis, a composer, the week before the grand finale in Dublin. A few weeks after the contest they married. Marianna and the song, "Horepse" scored 39 points and reached 12th place. Marianna and Manolis decided to move to Crete in 2002. He works as an architect and she as a music teacher. Together they formed the duo Notios Anemos (Southern Wind) and they perform in music festivals, concerts and theatrical plays in Crete. They published a record together in 2005.

Discography
 1995 – Diavatirio Psixis (Soul Passport)-LP by Warner Music
 1996 – Akou loipon (So, Listen to That)-LP by Warner Music
 1997 – Horepse (Dance)-CD single, promo only
 2005 – San Minoiko Karavi (Like a Minoan Boat)-LP by Seistron

External links
Eurovision Greece
ERT
OGAE Greece

1967 births
Living people
Greek educators
Eurovision Song Contest entrants for Greece
21st-century Greek women singers
Greek folk musicians
Eurovision Song Contest entrants of 1997
Singers from Athens
20th-century Greek educators
20th-century Greek women singers